Samer Hassan is a computer scientist, social scientist, activist and researcher, focused on the use of decentralized technologies to support commons-based collaboration. He is Associate Professor at Universidad Complutense de Madrid (Spain) and Faculty Associate at the Berkman Klein Center for Internet & Society at Harvard University. He is the recipient of an ERC Grant of 1.5M€ with the P2P Models project, to research blockchain-based decentralized autonomous organizations for the collaborative economy.

Education & career

Samer Hassan is a scholar with an interdisciplinary background, which combines computer sciences with social sciences and activism. He received a degree in Computer Science and MSc in Artificial Intelligence from the Universidad Complutense de Madrid (UCM) in Spain. He also studied 3 years of Political Science at the distance learning university UNED. He has then undertaken a PhD in Social Simulation at the department of Software Engineering and Artificial Intelligence of UCM, supervised by the computer scientist Juan Pavón and the sociologist Millán Arroyo-Menéndez.

He has been researching in several institutions, funded by several scholarships and awards, most notably Harvard's Real Colegio Complutense, and the Spanish postdoctoral grants Juan de la Cierva and José Castillejo. Thus, he was a visiting researcher at the Centre for Research in Social Simulation, in the Department of Sociology at the University of Surrey in the UK, working under the supervision of Nigel Gilbert (2007-2008), and a lecturer at the American University of Science and Technology in Lebanon (2010–11). He was selected as Fellow at the Berkman-Klein Center for Internet and Society at Harvard University (2015-2017) and is presently a Faculty Associate at the same structure.

Activism & social engagement
As an activist, Samer Hassan has been engaged in both offline (La Tabacalera de Lavapiés, Medialab-Prado) and online (Ourproject.org, Barrapunto, Wikipedia) initiatives. He was accredited as a grassroots facilitator by the Altekio Cooperative. He co-founded the Comunes Nonprofit in 2009 and the Move Commons webtool project in 2010. He has co-organized practitioner-oriented workshops on platform co-ops and free/open source decentralized tools for communities, and has presented his work in non-academic conferences of Mozilla, the Internet Archive, and others. As a privacy advocate, he co-created a course on cyber-ethics which has been teaching since 2013 (as of 2021). He was co-founder of the Sci-Fdi Spanish science-fiction magazine.

Work
Samer Hassan's PhD thesis focused on the methodological challenges for building data-driven social simulation models. The main model built simulated the transition from modern values to postmodern values in Spain. His methodological work also explored the combination of different Artificial Intelligence technologies, i.e. software agents with fuzzy logic, data mining, natural language processing, and microsimulation.

Hassan's interdisciplinary research spans multiple fields, including online collaborative communities, decentralized technologies, blockchain-based decentralized autonomous organizations, free/libre/open source software, Commons-based peer production, agent-based social simulation, social movements and cyberethics. He has published more than 50 works in these fields, and is recently focused on experimenting with multiple software systems to facilitate commons-based peer production, e.g. semantic-web labelling for commons-based initiatives, distribution of value in peer production communities, agent-supported online assemblies, decentralized real-time collaborative software, decentralized blockchain based reputation, or blockchain-enabled commons governance.

Hassan was Principal Investigator of the UCM partner in the EU-funded P2Pvalue project on building decentralized web-tools for collaborative communities. As such, he led the team that created SwellRT, a federated backend-as-a-service focused to ease development of apps featuring real-time collaboration. Intellectual Property of this project was transferred to the Apache Software Foundation in 2017. As part of this research line, Hassan's team also develop two SwellRT-based apps, "Teem" for management of social collectives and Jetpad, a federated real time editor. He presented the innovations concerning these software at Harvard's Berkman Klein Center and Harvard's Center for Research on Computation and Society.

Other research lines offered outcomes beyond publications. "Wikichron", coled by Javier Arroyo, is a web tool to visualize MediaWiki community metrics, currently in production and available for third-parties. "Decentralized Science", led by Hassan's PhD student Ámbar Tenorio-Fornés, is a framework to facilitate decentralized infrastructure and open peer review in the scientific publication process, which has been selected by the European Commission to receive funding as a spin-off social enterprise. His research on blockchain and crowdfunding models awarded him with a commission from Triple Canopy. His team pushed forward a mapping of the ecosystem of blockchain for social good, led by the Joint Research Centre and published by the European Commission.

As part of his ERC project P2P Models, Samer Hassan and his team are investigating whether blockchain technology and Decentralized Autonomous Organizations could contribute to improving the governance of commons-oriented communities, both online and offline. Their work has been showcased for tackling the impact of blockchain on governance, proposing alternatives to the current sharing economy, emerging forms of techno-social systems like NFTs, or giving relevance to gender issues in the field. Hassan was invited to present the project achievements in Harvard Kennedy School, MIT Media Lab, Harvard's Data Privacy Lab, Harvard's Center for Research on Computation and Society, and Harvard's SEAS EconCS. British MP and Opposition Leader Ed Miliband showcased his research and its potential impact on policy.

Selected works
 Rozas, D., Tenorio-Fornes, A., Diaz-Molina, S., Hassan, S. (2021). When Ostrom Meets Blockchain: Exploring the Potentials of Blockchain for Commons Governance. SAGE Open 11(1), 21582440211002526. https://doi.org/10.1177/21582440211002526
Faqir-Rhazoui, Y., Ariza-Garzón, M. J., Arroyo, J., & Hassan, S. (2021). Effect of the Gas Price Surges on User Activity in the DAOs of the Ethereum Blockchain. In 2021 CHI Conference on Human Factors in Computing Systems (pp. 1–7). https://doi.org/10.1145/3411763.3451755 
Hassan, S., & De Filippi, P. (2021). Decentralized Autonomous Organization. Glossary of decentralised technosocial systems. Internet Policy Review, 10(2). https://doi.org/10.14763/2021.2.1556
Hassan, S., Brekke, J.K., Atzori, M., Bodó, B., Meiklejohn, S., De Filippi, P., Beecroft, K., Rozas, D., Orgaz Alonso, C., Martínez Vicente, E., Lopéz Morales, G. and Figueras Aguilar, A. (2020). Scanning the European Ecosystem of Distributed Ledger Technologies for Social and Public Good, Roque Mendes Polvora, A., Hakami, A. and Bol, E. editor(s), EUR 30364 EN, Publications Office of the European Union, Luxembourg, 2020, ISBN 978-92-76-21577-6, https://doi.org/10.2760/300796
De Filippi, P., & Hassan, S. (2016). Blockchain technology as a regulatory technology: From code is law to law is code. First Monday, 21(12). http://dx.doi.org/10.5210/fm.v21i12.7113
Hassan, S., Arroyo, J., Galán, J. M., Antunes, L., & Pavón, J. (2013). Asking the oracle: Introducing forecasting principles into agent-based modelling. Journal of Artificial Societies and Social Simulation, 16(3), 13 https://doi.org/10.18564/jasss.2241

See also
 P2Pvalue project at WikiMedia Meta
SwellRT
Decentralized autonomous organization
Harvard's Berkman Klein Center for Internet & Society

References

External links
 Personal webpage
 Bio at Berkman Klein Center at Harvard
 P2P Models webpage

Berkman Fellows
Living people
European Research Council grantees
Lebanese activists
Academic staff of the American University of Science and Technology
Academic staff of the Complutense University of Madrid
Artificial intelligence researchers
Writers from Madrid
Complutense University of Madrid alumni
Spanish scientists
Internet activists
21st-century Spanish scientists
Spanish computer scientists
1982 births
Natural language processing researchers
Spanish activists
Alumni of the University of Surrey
Non-binary computer scientists
Decentralized autonomous organizations
Spanish social scientists